Entwisle is a surname. Notable people with the surname include:

Gertrude Lilian Entwisle (1892–1961), British electrical engineer
 Edmund Entwisle (1660–1707), English clergyman
Joseph Entwisle (1767–1841), English Methodist minister
Peter Entwisle (1948–2018), New Zealand art historian
Richard William Entwisle (born 1986), namesake of the minor planet 21522 Entwisle
Timothy John Entwisle (born 1965), Australian botanist
William Entwisle (1808–1865), British politician

See also 
 Bertine Entwisle Sutton (1886–1946), British pilot and Air Marshall
 Entwistle (disambiguation)
 Entwistle (surname)